Drury High School is a public school in North Adams, Massachusetts, United States.  Part of the North Adams Public School District, it serves students in grades 7-12 from North Adams, and the towns of Clarksburg, Florida, and Monroe.

Current standing
Drury currently serves grades 7–12.

As of 2014, it had a student body of 459 students.

Drury competes primarily within Berkshire County, though a small portion of its non-league independent schedule includes similar-size schools from the Connecticut River Valley of Western Massachusetts and nearby Vermont.

One of two high schools in North Adams, Massachusetts (Charles H. McCann Technical High School)

Most traditional rival is Hoosac Valley High School of Cheshire.

Notable alumni 

 Daniel E. Bosley, former member of the Massachusetts House of Representatives
 Gailanne M. Cariddi, former member of the Massachusetts House of Representatives
 Martha Coakley, former Massachusetts Attorney General 
 William Evans (19802021), Class of 1998, Capitol Police officer killed in the April 2021 United States Capitol car attack
 Peter Laird, comic book creator (Teenage Mutant Ninja Turtles)
 Frank J. Sprague, inventor
 Jane Swift (born 1965), Class of 1983, former Massachusetts Lieutenant 
Governor and Acting Governor

References

External links

North Adams Public Schools
Drury High School history

North Adams, Massachusetts
Buildings and structures in North Adams, Massachusetts
Schools in Berkshire County, Massachusetts
Public high schools in Massachusetts
Educational institutions established in 1843
1843 establishments in Massachusetts